The Magick Image File Format, abbreviated MIFF, is an image format used by ImageMagick. It may be used to store bitmap images platform-independently.

A MIFF file consists of two sections. The headers consist of ISO-8859-1 encoded bytes, each with pairs consisting of key=value. Keys include background-color, depth, compression rows, units, and custom key/value pairs. The latter can include things like copyright or comment. The list is terminated with a NULL character.

The next section contains the binary image data. The exact format is defined by the class header. Usually it is RGBA or CMYK.

External links 
 Magick Image File Format specification -- from ImageMagick's website

Graphics file formats